Euophrys cochlea is a jumping spider species in the genus Euophrys that lives in South Africa. It was first described in 2014.

References

Endemic fauna of South Africa
Salticidae
Spiders described in 2014
Spiders of South Africa
Taxa named by Wanda Wesołowska